In number theory, the Eichler–Shimura congruence relation expresses the local L-function of a modular curve at a prime p in terms of the eigenvalues of Hecke operators. Roughly speaking, it says that the correspondence on the modular curve inducing the Hecke operator Tp is congruent mod p to the sum of the Frobenius map Frob and its transpose Ver. In other words,

Tp = Frob + Ver  
as endomorphisms of the Jacobian J0(N)Fp of the modular curve X0N over the finite field Fp.

The Eichler–Shimura congruence relation and its generalizations to Shimura varieties play a pivotal role in the Langlands program, by identifying a part of the Hasse–Weil zeta function of a modular curve or a more general modular variety,  with the product of Mellin transforms of weight 2 modular forms or a product of analogous automorphic L-functions.

References 

 

 Goro Shimura, Introduction to the arithmetic theory of automorphic functions, Publ. of Math. Soc. of Japan, 11, 1971

Modular forms
Zeta and L-functions
Theorems in number theory